Dermival Almeida Lima nickname Baiano (the Demonym of Bahia state) (born 28 June 1978) is a Brazilian former football right back.

Career
He left Russia on 18 April 2007, for Náutico, but left for Santos on 1 August 2007, signed a deal until the end of 2007.

He signed a contract with Vasco da Gama until the end of 2008 in September 2008.

Honours
Tournament Rio - São Paulo: 1997
Conmebol Cup: 1998
Pre-Olympic Tournament: 2000
Brazilian League (2nd division): 2003

External links

 Brazilian FA database
 sambafoot
 zerozero
 rsssf
Profile at globo.com 

1978 births
Sportspeople from Bahia
Living people
Brazilian footballers
Association football fullbacks
Santos FC players
Esporte Clube Vitória players
UD Las Palmas players
Clube Atlético Mineiro players
Sociedade Esportiva Palmeiras players
Boca Juniors footballers
FC Rubin Kazan players
Clube Náutico Capibaribe players
CR Vasco da Gama players
Atlético Nacional footballers
Paulista Futebol Clube players
Guarani FC players
Red Bull Brasil players
Brasiliense Futebol Clube players
Sociedade Esportiva do Gama players
Vila Nova Futebol Clube players
Brasília Futebol Clube players
Associação Atlética Luziânia players
La Liga players
Segunda División players
Argentine Primera División players
Russian Premier League players
Campeonato Brasileiro Série A players
Categoría Primera A players
Olympic footballers of Brazil
Footballers at the 2000 Summer Olympics
Brazilian expatriate footballers
Expatriate footballers in Spain
Brazilian expatriate sportspeople in Spain
Expatriate footballers in Argentina
Brazilian expatriate sportspeople in Argentina
Expatriate footballers in Russia
Brazilian expatriate sportspeople in Russia
Expatriate footballers in Colombia
Brazilian expatriate sportspeople in Colombia
Brazilian football managers
Paulista Futebol Clube managers